The Capitol Theater, at 206 East Fifth Avenue in downtown Olympia, Washington, was built in 1924. It was designed by architect Joseph Wohleb and has a capacity of 1,500. Since 1986, the Olympia Film Society operates the theater.

The theater suffered major plaster damage to the ceiling during the 2001 Nisqually earthquake, but has since undergone repair and has re-opened. The marquee, a 1940 addition, was removed in January 2008.

The theater played host to the International Pop Underground Convention, a punk and indie rock music festival in 1991, as well as the similarly themed Yoyo A Go Go in 1994, 1997, 1999, and 2001.

References

External links

Puget Sound Theater Organ Society, which has some photographs of the theater
Olympia Film Society official site. Includes schedules for the theater.
The Olympian (newspaper) photo gallery of marquee removal

Buildings and structures in Olympia, Washington
Theatres in Washington (state)
Tourist attractions in Olympia, Washington
Theatres completed in 1924